Water on Mars is the fourth studio album by Purling Hiss, which was released on March 19, 2013, in Drag City.

Track listing

Personnel
Adapted from the Water on Mars liner notes.

Purling Hiss
 Kiel Everett – bass guitar
 Mike Polizze – vocals, electric guitar, production, cover art
 Mike Sneeringer – drums

Production and additional personnel
 Paul Gold – mastering
 Adam Granduciel – production, piano (5)
 Jason Killinger – cover art
 Jeff Zeigler – production, recording

Release history

References

External links 
 

2013 albums
Purling Hiss albums
Albums produced by Adam Granduciel
Drag City (record label) albums